Charcas is a town and municipality in San Luis Potosí in central Mexico. The municipality covers an area of 4.911 km². As of 2020, the municipality had a total population of 14,117 people. Charcas is just south of the Tropic of Cancer.

The town was founded in 1578 by Spanish conquistadors.

Government

Municipal presidents

References

Municipalities of San Luis Potosí
Populated places established in 1578